Eva Renzi (born Evelyn Renziehausen; 3 November 1944 - 16 August 2005) was a German actress.

Biography
Born in Berlin to a Danish father and a French mother, she enrolled in the Berlin Actors' Studio at age 16 and began appearing in plays in Germany. For eight months she played a maid in the German translation of Noël Coward's Dinner at Eight. She was married briefly and gave birth to her daughter Anouschka; when the marriage ended, she began a modelling career to support herself and her daughter. After modelling clothing in German magazines and newspapers, she was introduced to film audiences in Will Tremper's  (1966) and made her international debut the same year in the British film Funeral in Berlin, the second Harry Palmer film, as Israeli agent Samantha Steel, appearing with Michael Caine.

Renzi was offered a leading role in the next planned James Bond film, You Only Live Twice, but Renzi declined the role, commenting in an interview in Newark Evening News that "Bond pictures are good for pretty girls but not for actresses. I would rather sell shoes." She turned down other roles, including an offer by director Orson Welles, due to her husband's jealousy. When she and Hubschmid began their separation, eventually leading to divorce, her career stagnated further.

She later featured with James Garner in The Pink Jungle (1968) as Alison Duquesne, and in the giallo thriller The Bird with the Crystal Plumage (1970) as Monica Ranieri.

In 1973, Renzi caused a sensation in the tabloid press by taking a months-long trip to India and becoming involved with the Rajneesh movement, which she later left, accusing the leader, Bhagwan Shree Rajneesh, of fascist tendencies and abusing drugs.

Renzi continued acting on stage after her film career had largely ended. In 1983, she was dismissed from the Bad Hersfelder Festspiele, a theater festival, for referring to President Karl Carstens, who had joined the Brownshirts in 1934, as an "old Nazi". In 2002 she staged a comeback in the play Amanda, which featured a monologue of a woman who emancipates herself after the death of her husband.

Personal life
From 1967 until 1980, she was married to Swiss actor Paul Hubschmid with whom she appeared in several films. She was the mother of actress .

Death
On 16 August 2005 Renzi died of lung cancer at the age of 60 in Berlin. She was buried at Luisenfriedhof III.

Filmography
  (German title: Playgirl) (1966, by Will Tremper) - Alexandra Borowski
 Funeral in Berlin (1966, by Guy Hamilton) - Samantha Steel
  (1967, by Pierre Granier-Deferre) - Patricia
 Negresco - Eine tödliche Affäre (1968)
 The Pink Jungle (1968, by Delbert Mann) - Alison Duguesne
 Eine Frau sucht Liebe (1969, by Robert Azderball) - Jane
 Taste of Excitement (1970, by Don Sharp) - Jane Kerrell

 The Bird with the Crystal Plumage (1970, by Dario Argento) - Monica Ranieri
 Rendezvous with Dishonour (1970, by Adriano Bolzoni) - Helena
 Love, Vampire Style (1970, by Helmut Förnbacher) - Sabrina von der Wies
 La morte risale a ieri sera (1970, by Duccio Tessari) - Lamberti's wife
 Tatort (1971, Episode: "") - Tatjana
 Primus (1971–1972, TV Series, 26 episodes) - Toni Hayden
  (1971, TV Mini-Series) - Julie Andrew
 Das Blaue Palais (1976, TV Mini-Series, 2 episodes) - Eva
  (1981, by Jacques Doillon) - La fiancée
 Manuel (1986) - Manuel's Mother

References

External links

Archival interview with Eva Renzi

1944 births
2005 deaths
German film actresses
German stage actresses
German television actresses
20th-century German actresses
Actresses from Berlin
Deaths from lung cancer in Germany